Huncho Jack is an American hip hop superduo composed of Atlanta-based musician Quavo of Migos and Houston-based musician Travis Scott. The duo released their debut studio album Huncho Jack, Jack Huncho on December 21, 2017 to received generally favorable reviews.

Background 
The group's name is derived from Quavo's nickname "Huncho" and Travis Scott's record label Cactus Jack Records, which in turn is derived from his legal first name Jacques, which is the French equivalent of Jack in English.

History

2016–2017: Formation and album 

In December 2016, Quavo announced a collaborative album with Travis Scott on Scott's Apple Music Wav Radio show, previewing numerous recorded tracks. On April 3, 2017, it was further reported Scott had been working on a collaborative album with Quavo, with whom he previously worked with on the track "Oh My Dis Side" from Scott's debut album Rodeo, and the Young Thug collaboration "Pick Up the Phone", released in 2017. Speaking to GQ, he confirmed: "The Quavo album is coming soon. I'm dropping new music soon. You know how I do it though: I like surprises."

In an interview with Montreality published on September 18, 2017, Quavo stated that the collaborative album would be released "real soon". He also stated that he and Travis Scott have over 20 records ready. On December 7, 2017, a clip of Quavo being interviewed by Zane Lowe was posted on the official Twitter account for Beats 1. When asked about the title of their upcoming project, he confirmed it would be Huncho Jack, Jack Huncho. Huncho Jack, Jack Huncho was released two weeks later on December 21, 2017, for streaming and digital download by Grand Hustle Records, Epic Records, Cactus Jack Records, Quality Control Music, Capitol Records and Motown.

Discography

Studio albums

References 

2016 establishments in the United States
African-American musical groups
American hip hop groups
Musical groups established in 2016
Musical groups from Atlanta
Musical groups from Houston